The 1983 Boston University Terriers football team was an American football team that represented Boston University as a member of the Yankee Conference during the 1983 NCAA Division I-AA football season. In their seventh season under head coach Rick Taylor, the Terriers compiled a 9–4 record (4–1 against conference opponents), tied for the conference championship, lost to Furman in the quarterfinals of the NCAA Division I-AA Football Championship playoffs, and outscored opponents by a total of 315 to 198.

Schedule

References

Boston University
Boston University Terriers football seasons
Yankee Conference football champion seasons
Boston University Terriers football